Denis Cristofovici is a Moldovan goalkeeper who currently is playing for FC Olimpia Bălți.

References
http://moldova.sports.md/denis_cristofovici/stats/

1986 births
Living people
Association football goalkeepers
Moldovan footballers
CSF Bălți players